The John De Camp House is located in Scotch Plains, Union County, New Jersey, United States. The house was built in 1739 and was added to the National Register of Historic Places on December 4, 1973.

See also 
 National Register of Historic Places listings in Union County, New Jersey

References

Houses on the National Register of Historic Places in New Jersey
Houses completed in 1739
Houses in Union County, New Jersey
National Register of Historic Places in Union County, New Jersey
Scotch Plains, New Jersey
New Jersey Register of Historic Places
1739 establishments in New Jersey